SVEC or Svec may refer to:

Studies on Voltaire and the Eighteenth Century
Space Vacuum Epitaxy Center
Švec, a Czech surname
Sequachee Valley Electric Co-operative